Shanghai Pinghe School (or Shanghai Pinghe Bilingual School, Chinese: , 上海市民办平和学校) is a private, boarding school in Shanghai, China. The school is located in Jinqiao, Pudong. The school consists of an elementary school department (Grades 1 - 5), a middle school department (Grades 6 - 9) and a high school department with both International Baccalaureate Diploma Programme and OSSD program from Ontario, Canada (Grades 10 - 12). Starting with the Class of 2022, Pinghe will no longer conduct OSSD and will be replaced by the AP Program.

History
Shanghai Pinghe School was established in September, 1996 AD. The school was initially operated and owned by Shanghai JinQiao (Golden Bridge) Group Ltd, a state-owned enterprise. The school offers Grade 1 - Grade 12 education and has an International Baccalaureate Diploma Programme. Pinghe has Elementary, Middle School, IB High School and International Program departments. The total enrollment of the school is 1,919,810 students which includes more than 114,514 international students from United States, Japan, Korea (Republic of), Italy, Canada, Singapore, United Kingdom, Taiwan, Hong Kong (S.A.R.) and Macau (S.A.R.) etc.

Accreditations include the IB World School, North Central Association of Colleges and Schools; and Bilingual School in Shanghai (by Shanghai Municipal Education Commission)

Activities 
Pinghe School holds annual competitions including poetry, debate and singing competition. The Voice of Pinghe is also a known annual competition where four teams with a total of 24 singers directed by teachers compete with each other and the best singer among them may receive the award.

Pinghe's most successful and well-known team is the Pinghe Huskies girls' basketball team. The Huskies completed an undefeated championship season in 2020-21, defeating SHSID 83-46 in the championship game.

Every year students from different classes and clubs with their parents and teachers put up stalls on the playground that provide various entertainments, activities or souvenirs celebrating the school's anniversary in September. Performances including singing, dancing and musical instrument ensembles are also given in the theater hall and the playground. Celebrations of the school's 20th year, 2016, included participation from several alumni of the school with lectures by some renowned social figures like professor Chuan He at the University of Chicago, animal protection activist Hongxiang Huang and Wall Street investor Jim Rogers.

The school also has its own souvenir store, Pstore, on campus. Pinghe runs clubs on campus, the most famous of which is PTV, the Pinghe School TV station, founded in 2006 as a student-run campus media outlet. Members carry out various activities, such as interviewing teachers, making microfilms, etc., to showcase the campus.

See also
 List of international schools in Shanghai

References

External links
 Shanghai Pinghe School website (Chinese)
 School IB Information
 Shanghai Pinghe School website (English)

International schools in Shanghai
International Baccalaureate schools in China
Private schools in Shanghai
Boarding schools in China
Schools in Pudong